José Martin Quesada Nortes (26 May 1935 – 18 June 1996) was a Spanish professional cyclist, who was professional between 1957 and 1966. José Martin notably play a stage of the Vuelta a Levante and Vuelta a Andalucía. He retired from cycling at the end of the 1966 season.

Biography
José Martin was born in Elche on 26 May 1935 and died in Elche, Valenciana at the age of 61. He finished 7th in the general classification of the 1961 Vuelta a Andalucía road race, and he also finished 6th general classification of the 1963 Vuelta a Andalucía road race.

Career
José Martin turned professional with the C.C. Barcelones team. His cycling career spanned 13 seasons. José Martin competed in the Tour de l'Avenir road race. His main victory was the Trofeo Masferrer in 1961. José Martin last play was the Vuelta a Andalucía in 1966. He finished 5th in the 1963 editions of the gran premio fedrácion catalana de ciclismo.

Major results

1961
 1st Trofeo Jaumendreu
 7th Vuelta a Andalucía
1963
 7th Vuelta a Andalucía
 2nd Stage 1 Vuelta a Levante
 4th Stage 3 Vuelta a Levante
 8th Vuelta a Levante
 3rd Vuelta a Levante
 5th Gran Premio Fedrácion Catalana de Ciclismo - Trofeo Club Drink
 5th Stage 14 Tour de l'Avenir
 2nd Stage 7 Volta a Catalunya
1950
 3rd Trofeo Jaumendreu
1966
 2nd Stage 4 Vuelta a Andalucía
 3rd Stage 8 Vuelta a Andalucía

References

External links
 

1935 births
1996 deaths
Spanish male cyclists
Volta a Catalunya cyclists
Sportspeople from Elche
Cyclists from the Valencian Community